Miguel Ángel Riau Ferragut (born 27 January 1989) is a Spanish footballer who plays as a left winger.

Football career
Born in Lleida, Catalonia, Riau emerged through Levante UD's youth system, reaching the club at the age of 15. In 2007–08, he appeared in four games with the reserve team as the season ended in relegation from Segunda División B; he made his debut on 27 August 2007 in a 2–2 away draw against Ontinyent CF, starting and scoring in the match.

From 2008 to 2010, Riau competed again in the third level, with Valencia CF's reserves. After suffering relegation at the end of his second campaign, he signed for three years with FC Cartagena in Segunda División.

Riau made his league debut with Efesé on 3 October 2010, playing ten minutes in a 1–1 draw at CD Tenerife. His stay with the Murcian club was greatly hampered by injuries, however, and he was also loaned to former side Valencia B in January 2011.

References

External links

1989 births
Living people
Sportspeople from Lleida
Spanish footballers
Footballers from Catalonia
Association football wingers
Segunda División players
Segunda División B players
Tercera División players
Atlético Levante UD players
Valencia CF Mestalla footballers
FC Cartagena footballers
CE Sabadell FC footballers